The following is a complete list of episodes of the television drama series Room 222.

Series overview

Episodes

Season 1 (1969–70)

Season 2 (1970–71)

Season 3 (1971–72)

Season 4 (1972–73)

Season 5 (1973–74)

References

Lists of American comedy-drama television series episodes